Benjamin Tiedemann Hansen (born 7 February 1994) is a Danish professional footballer who plays as a centre-back for Eliteserien club Molde.

Career

Early career
Hansen started his career as a three-year-old in Skovby GF. At the age of five, he moved to Bogense G&IF. As a 12-year-old he began playing for Næsby Boldklub's youth teams, where he played until 2009. His last season with Næsby Boldklub he played senior football in the Danish divisions at the age of 15.

In the summer of 2009 he began attending , where he could combine an efterskole education, which his parents wanted, with playing academy football for Vejle Boldklub. He played for Vejle for four years for both the U17 and U19 teams. The first year he finished Danish folkeskole, after which he completed  (HHX) at the business high school at Campus Vejle.

Marienlyst
Hansen signed with Marienlyst on 6 July 2013. He played a total of three seasons for the club, and he was team captain for Marienlyst during his final season there.

Fredericia
Hansen moved to FC Fredericia in the summer of 2016. During his sole season at the club, he made 34 appearances.

Nordsjælland
Hansen signed with Danish Superliga club Nordsjælland in August 2017. He made his league debut on 22 September 2017 in a game against SønderjyskE, coming on as a substitute for Mads Aaquist in the 90th minute. Five days later, on 27 September 2017, he made his starting debut in the Danish Cup against Vejgaard BK, which FC Nordsjælland won 4–0 away at Soffy Road.

Haugesund
On 19 March 2019, Hansen signed with Norwegian club Haugesund. He played there for three seasons, and grew into the club's team captain, before leaving the club when his contract expired in December 2021. He made 102 total appearances for the club, scoring four goals.

Molde
On 2 February 2022, Molde reached an agreement for Hansen to join the club. He signed a three-year contract. He made his debut on 13 March in the round of 16 of the Norwegian Football Cup, starting at centre-back in a 3–2 win over Odd. Molde would eventually win the 2021–22 Norwegian Football Cup after a 1–0 win over Bodø/Glimt in the final, with Hansen playing the full game. Hansen made his league debut for Molde on the first matchday of the domestic season in a 1–0 win over Vålerenga on 2 April.

Career statistics

Club

Honours
Molde

 Eliteserien: 2022
 Norwegian Cup: 2021–22

References

External links
 

1994 births
Living people
Association football defenders
Danish men's footballers
Næsby Boldklub players
BK Marienlyst players
FC Fredericia players
Vejle Boldklub players
FC Nordsjælland players
FK Haugesund players
Molde FK players
Danish 1st Division players
Danish Superliga players
Eliteserien players
Danish expatriate men's footballers
Expatriate footballers in Norway
Danish expatriate sportspeople in Norway
People from Nordfyn Municipality
Sportspeople from the Region of Southern Denmark